Nikolai Lemtyugov (born 15 January 1986) is a Russian former professional ice hockey player. His career, which lasted from 2004 to 2020, was mainly spent in the Russian Superleague and the Kontinental Hockey League.

Playing career
Lemtyugov was drafted 219th overall in the 2005 NHL Entry Draft by the St. Louis Blues. Nikolay spent time in the Russian Super League before coming to North America for the 2007–08 season and playing for the Peoria Rivermen, affiliate of the Blues. On December 15, 2008, it was reported that Lemtyugov had quit the Rivermen and was signed to a multi-year deal with Severstal Cherepovets.

In July 2019, Lemtyugov moved to the UK to sign for Sheffield Steelers, reuniting with his former coach Aaron Fox in the process.

Career statistics

Regular season and playoffs

International

References

External links

1986 births
Living people
Ak Bars Kazan players
Atlant Moscow Oblast players
Avangard Omsk players
HC CSKA Moscow players
HC Neftekhimik Nizhnekamsk players
HC Sibir Novosibirsk players
HC Spartak Moscow players
HC Yugra players
HL Anyang players
Metallurg Magnitogorsk players
People from Miass
Peoria Rivermen (AHL) players
Russian ice hockey left wingers
St. Louis Blues draft picks
Severstal Cherepovets players
Sheffield Steelers players
Sportspeople from Chelyabinsk Oblast
Traktor Chelyabinsk players